Gyldendal may refer to:
Gyldendal, a Danish publishing house
Gyldendal Norsk Forlag, a Norwegian publishing house founded as a demerger from the Danish one
Søren Gyldendal, the founder of the Danish publishing house